Sir Francis Graeme Tyrrell  (1876–1964) was a British colonial administrator. A son of Lieutenant-General Francis Hardinge Tyrrell of the Indian Army, he was the Colonial Secretary of Ceylon and served as an acting Governor of British Ceylon. He was appointed on 20 September 1933 and was acting Governor until 23 December 1933. He was succeeded by Reginald Edward Stubbs.

He was created a Companion of the Order of St Michael and St George in the 1928 New Year Honours while serving as the Controller of Revenue in Ceylon and Knight Commander of the Order of the British Empire in the 1934 New Year Honours while serving as the Colonial Secretary of Ceylon.
His sister Beatrix Maud was the wife of John Jamieson Willis, Bishop of Uganda.

References

Governors of British Ceylon
British expatriates in Sri Lanka
19th-century British people
1876 births
1964 deaths
Knights Commander of the Order of the British Empire
Companions of the Order of St Michael and St George
Chief Secretaries of Ceylon
Members of the Legislative Council of Ceylon